Binibining Pilipinas 2007 was the 44th edition of Binibining Pilipinas. It took place at the Smart Araneta Coliseum in Quezon City, Metro Manila, Philippines on March 3, 2007.

At the end of the event, Lia Andrea Ramos crowned Anna Theresa Licaros as Binibining Pilipinas Universe 2007, Anna Maris Igpit crowned Margaret Wilson as Binibining Pilipinas World 2007, and Denille Lou Valmonte crowned Nadia Lee Cien Shami as Binibining Pilipinas International 2007. Liezel Verses was named First Runner-Up and Abigail Lesley Cruz was named 2nd Runner-Up.

Results 
Color keys
  The contestant did not place but won a Special Award in the pageant.
  The contestant did not place.

§ – Voted into the Top 13 by Smart texters

Special Awards

Contestants 
30 contestants competed for the three titles:

Notes

Post-pageant Notes 
 Anna Theresa Licaros competed at Miss Universe 2007 in Mexico City but was unplaced. However, Licaros won the Miss Photogenic award.
 Maggie Wilson competed at Miss World 2007 in Sanya, China but was unplaced. Nadia Lee Cien Shami was also unplaced when she competed at Miss International 2007 in Tokyo.
 Nicole Schmitz competed again at Binibining Pilipinas 2012 and won Binibining Pilipinas International 2012. She competed at Miss International 2012 in Okinawa and was one of the fifteen semifinalists.

References

2007
2007 in the Philippines
2007 beauty pageants